is a private university in Utsunomiya, Tochigi, Japan, established in 1999. The university also has a graduate school. The university is affiliated with the Utsunomiya Bunsei Junior College and the Hidehumi Ueno Memorial Museum.

External links
 Official website 

Educational institutions established in 1999
Private universities and colleges in Japan
Universities and colleges in Tochigi Prefecture
1999 establishments in Japan
Art schools in Japan
Utsunomiya